The following elections occurred in the year 1817.

North America

United States
 1817 New York gubernatorial election

See also
 :Category:1817 elections

1817
Elections